The discography of American country singer–songwriter Ashley McBryde contains three studio albums, two demo albums, two extended plays (EPs), seven singles, five promotional singles, one charting song, eight music videos and has appeared on four albums. In 2006 and 2011, McBryde self-released demo albums. She later signed with Warner Music Nashville and issued 2016's Jalopies & Expensive Guitars (EP). In 2017, McBryde's single titled "A Little Dive Bar in Dahlonega" reached the top 30 of the American country charts. It was followed her debut major-label studio album named Girl Going Nowhere (2018). The disc reached the top ten of the Billboard country albums list and the top 50 of the Billboard 200. The title track was later spawned as a single in 2019 and also reached the American country top 40.

In 2019, McBryde also released the single "One Night Standards". The song was her first to reach the top 20 of the Billboard Hot Country Songs and Country Airplay charts. It also was certified platinum in sales for over one million copies in the United States. The song was followed by the studio album titled Never Will, which reached the top five of the country albums chart and the top 60 of the Billboard 200. The disc also spawned the 2020 single "Martha Divine", which charted the Country Airplay chart in 2020. In 2021, a duet with Carly Pearce titled "Never Wanted to Be That Girl" was released as a single. Her third studio album, the concept album Lindeville, was released in September 2022.

Albums

Studio albums

Demo albums

Extended plays

Singles

As lead artist

As a featured artist

Promotional singles

Other charted songs

Music videos

Other album appearances

Notes

References

External links
 Ashley McBryde discography at her official website

Discographies of American artists
Country music discographies